Zaller is a surname. Notable people with the surname include:

Lila Bita Zaller, Greek-American author, poet, translator, and drama teacher
John Zaller (born 1949), American political scientist and professor
Robert Zaller (born 1940), American author

See also
Zeller (surname)